Hemilienardia contortula is a species of sea snail, a marine gastropod mollusk in the family Raphitomidae.

Description
The length of the shell attains 5½ mm, its diameter 2½ mm.

(Original description) The shell is globosely conical, somewhat peculiarly twisted or bent, with a distinct suture. It is white, with a pink tinge towards the top. The apex is very obtuse, with a decollated appearance. The shell contains 6 whorls. They are longitudinally ribbed, with the ribs thick and prominent, distantly transversely striated, so as to present a granulose appearance. At the base of the body whorl occur several rows of small granules. The columella is peculiarly twisted. The aperture is narrowly contracted. The outer lip is thick, in the middle bent inwards.

Distribution
This marine species occurs off Sri Lanka.

References

 Wiedrick S.G. (2017). Aberrant geomorphological affinities in four conoidean gastropod genera, Clathurella Carpenter, 1857 (Clathurellidae), Lienardia Jousseaume, 1884 (Clathurellidae), Etrema Hedley, 1918 (Clathurellidae) and Hemilienardia Boettger, 1895 (Raphitomidae), with the descriptionof fourteen new Hemilienardia species from the Indo-Pacific. The Festivus. special issue: 2-45.

External links
 

contortula
Gastropods described in 1875